At least two vessels have been named Willerby:

 was launched in 1799 as a West Indiaman. French privateers captured her around early 1802, but then released her. She suffered damage in a gale in 1815, but continued to trade. She sailed to New South Wales and was wrecked in early 1818.
 was a steel screw steamer of  launched at Stockton.

Ship names